Hell Bent for Leather is a 1960 American CinemaScope Western film directed by George Sherman and starring Audie Murphy, Felicia Farr, Stephen McNally and Robert Middleton. The film was based on the 1959 novel Outlaw Marshal by Ray Hogan and filmed on location in the Alabama Hills of Lone Pine, California.

Plot
Clay Santell (Audie Murphy) has his horse stolen and stops in the town of Sutterville. He is mistaken by townspeople for a murderer named Travers (Jan Merlin), and is handed over to Marshal Harry Deckett (Stephen McNally). Deckett knows the truth but decides to kill Clay and pass him off as the real Travers to enhance his reputation and collect the reward money. Clay escapes and takes a woman (Felicia Farr) hostage until he can prove his innocence.

Cast
 Audie Murphy as Clay
 Felicia Farr as Janet
 Stephen McNally as Deckett
 Robert Middleton as Ambrose
 Rad Fulton as Moon
 Jan Merlin as Travers
 Herbert Rudley as Perrick
 Malcolm Atterbury as Gamble
 Joseph Ruskin as Shad
 Allan Lane as Kelsey
 John Qualen as Old Ben
 Eddie Little Sky as William 
 Steve Gravers as Grover
 Beau Gentry as Stone
 Bob Steele as Jared

Production
The film was the first of seven low-budget Westerns Audie Murphy made for producer Gordon Kay at Universal. They would be shot in 18–20 days at a budget of around $500,000, and normally feature only three main roles: the hero (played by Murphy), female lead, and villain. The other films were:
Seven Ways from Sundown (1960)
Posse from Hell (1961)
Six Black Horses (1962)
Showdown (1963)
Bullet for a Badman (1964)
Gunpoint (1966)

See also
 List of American films of 1960

References

External links

1960 films
1960 Western (genre) films
American action films
Audie Murphy
1960s English-language films
Universal Pictures films
Films directed by George Sherman
Films scored by William Lava
American Western (genre) films
Films based on American novels
Films based on Western (genre) novels
Films shot in Lone Pine, California
1960s American films